Ganges (Languedocien: Gange) is a commune in the Hérault department in Occitanie in southern France.

Location

Ganges is situated at the confluence of the Hérault and Rieutord rivers.

History
The castle, of which only ruins remain, was the scene of a murder in the 17th century. The beautiful Dianne de Roussan was killed by her husband's brothers, who wanted her large fortune. They were caught and subsequently executed.

Ganges became prosperous from the manufacture of fine silk stockings during the reign of Louis XIV. Natural silk was replaced by artificial, and later by nylon, and cottage industry gave way to factories; half a dozen or so still produce high quality stockings.

In August 1944, German forces unsuccessfully tried to force a way down the Hérault valley through Ganges; they were repelled by the defence of the Aigoual-Cévennes maquis.

Population

Tourism
The area around Ganges offers extensive activities, including kayaking, gliding and go-karting.

The moped mobylette was created by a resident of Ganges and a plaque near the old town commemorates this fact.

International relations
Ganges is the twin town of Schwalmtal (Germany).

Famous people
It was the birthplace of the author, poet and composer Antoine Fabre d'Olivet (December 8, 1767, – March 25, 1825, Paris)

See also
Communes of the Hérault department

References

Communes of Hérault